The Río Limay Subgroup is a geological unit of the Neuquén Group in the Neuquén Basin of Neuquén, Mendoza and Río Negro Provinces, northern Patagonia, Argentina. The strata date back to the Late Cretaceous (Early Cenomanian to Early Turonian. The Río Limay Subgroup overlies the Lohan Cura Formation, separated by an unconformity dated to 98 Ma. Dinosaur remains are among the fossils that have been recovered from the formations it contains.

Having previously been considered a distinct formation, the Río Limay Subgroup is now considered a member of the larger Neuquén Group, and itself contains several specific geological formations (from youngest to oldest):
 Lisandro Formation (late Cenomanian to early Turonian)
 Huincul Formation (late Cenomanian)
 Candeleros Formation (early Cenomanian)

Fossil content

See also 
 List of dinosaur-bearing rock formations

References

Bibliography 
 
 

Geologic formations of Argentina
Neuquén Group
Upper Cretaceous Series of South America
Cretaceous Argentina
Cenomanian Stage
Turonian Stage
Sandstone formations
Siltstone formations
Shale formations
Fossiliferous stratigraphic units of South America
Paleontology in Argentina
Geology of Mendoza Province
Geology of Neuquén Province
Geology of Río Negro Province
Limay